A rifled musket, rifle musket, or rifle-musket is a type of firearm made in the mid-19th century. Originally the term referred only to muskets that had been produced as a smoothbore weapon and later had their barrels replaced with rifled barrels. The term later included rifles that directly replaced, and were of the same design overall as, a particular model of smoothbore musket.

History and development
In the early 19th century, there were rifles, and there were muskets. Muskets were smoothbore muzzle-loading weapons, firing round lead balls or buck and ball ammunition, that were also designed to accept a bayonet. Rifles were similar in that they used the same kind of flintlock or caplock firing mechanism, but the main difference was that their barrels were rifled – that is, their barrels had grooves cut into the interior surface which would cause the bullet to spin as it left the barrel.

Rifles have the advantage of long range accuracy, because spinning bullets have far flatter and more stable trajectories than balls fired from smoothbore muskets. Muskets had the advantage of a faster rate of fire; for example, a trained British soldier could fire three rounds a minute with a musket, while a rifleman would average two. A muzzle-loaded weapon required the bullet to fit snugly into the barrel. For a smoothbore weapon this can be a somewhat loose fit, but in the case of a rifle, the helical rifling lands in the barrel have to cut into the bullet to make it spin. The fit needs to be sufficiently tight for the bullet to engage the lands in order to impart spin; otherwise the bullet will wobble, destroying its accuracy. Furthermore, if the barrel-to-bullet seal is not tight, gases will blow through the rifling grooves and around the bullet, compromising muzzle velocity, accuracy and the bullet's terminal energy at the target. Their greater accuracy and range made rifles ideal for hunting, but the slower rate of fire was a significant impediment for widespread military use, along with the fouling caused by normal firing which made them steadily more difficult to load.

The smoothbore musket was the main infantry weapon, while rifles were used only by snipers and other specialist troops. All muskets were supplied with bayonets, for use in melee combat. At the time, the Russian and French armies actively used light infantry (rangers and voltigeurs), and sometimes scattered whole infantry battalions as skirmishers to fight long-term on rough terrain. Although rifles had better shooting accuracy than smoothbore muskets, their effective fire range was the same. For example, in the British Army, light infantrymen armed with ordinary muskets were trained for 300–400 yards. Since they were also used as pikes, muskets tended to be fairly long and heavy weapons. The length of a musket also allowed them to be fired by ranks, minimizing the risk that the men in the rear ranks would accidentally shoot the men in the front ranks in the back of the head, or, more likely, scorch their faces and burst their eardrums with the muzzle blast. Muskets six feet in length could be fired in three ranks without fear of accidents.

The relative inaccuracy and short range of the musket was not considered to be significant on the battlefield, because smoke from the black powder used at the time quickly obscured the battlefield and rendered the longer range of the rifle useless, especially as a battle progressed.

Rifles were more expensive to make than muskets, and were typically used by small units of specialized riflemen trained not to fight in closed ranks, but in open order, spread out as skirmishers or sharpshooters. Since they were not fired over other men’s shoulders or designed for close-combat bayonet fighting, military rifles could be much shorter than muskets, which also made loading from the muzzle easier and reduced the difficulties associated with fitting the bullet into the barrel, although the rate of fire was still slower than that of a musket.

The problem of slow loading of rifles caused by barrel fouling was solved by the Minié ball, which was invented in the 1840s by French inventor Claude-Étienne Minié. Despite its name, the Minié ball was not a round ball at all – it was long and conical, with an expanding skirt at the rear of the bullet.  The skirt allowed the minié ball to be smaller than the barrel's bore, so it would slip in as easily as the ball of a smoothbore.   When the weapon was fired, the skirt expanded to fit tightly against the inside of the rifle barrel, with less energy wasted in blow-by around the projectile and ensuring that the rifling lands and grooves would impart a stabilizing spin to the minié ball.

In the 1840s and 1850s, many smoothbore muskets had their barrels replaced with similar barrels that were rifled so that they could fire a new type of bullet that greatly enhanced both its accuracy and range. These "rifled muskets" or "rifle muskets" were long enough to serve the function of muskets in close formations of line and square, were as quick to load as the old muskets and as easy to use with minimal training. Yet the Minié-type rifled muskets were much more accurate than smoothbore muskets. Tests of a rifled musket firing Minié ball, and a smoothbore musket firing round ball, at various ranges against a 10 by 10 inches (25 cm × 25 cm) target, showed much higher accuracy for the rifled musket. From a smooth-bore musket, from 42% to 48% of bullets hit the target at a distance of 200 yards. At a distance of 300 yards, 18% of the bullets hit the target. For a rifle, the results were much better. From a rifle, 46% to 58% of bullets hit the target at a distance of 300 yards; 24% to 42% at 500 yards. This potential accuracy, however, required skills only acquired through advanced training and practice; a rifle-musket in the hands of a raw recruit would not have performed very much better than a smoothbore. Nevertheless, the musket was still a formidable force on the battlefield. At the beginning of the American Civil War, some infantry regiments chose to keep smooth-bore muskets, preferring them because they could shoot "buck and ball".

In the 1860s and 1870s, newer weapons were produced with rifled barrels and continued to be referred to as "rifled muskets" or "rifle-muskets" even though they had not originally been produced with smoothbore barrels. The term was only used for weapons that directly replaced smoothbore muskets. For example, the Springfield Model 1861 with its percussion lock mechanism and long barrel was called a "rifled musket". In contrast, the Henry repeating rifle and the Spencer repeating rifle produced in the same time period did not replace a rifled musket and did not have other musket-like characteristics, and was just referred to as a "rifle". 

By the 1880s and 1890s, rifled muskets were made largely obsolete by single-shot breech-loading rifles and repeating rifles, such as the Springfield Model 1873 and Springfield Model 1892–99. A significant number of the single-shot breech-loading rifles were produced by simply changing out the percussion lock mechanism of a rifled musket. However, once this change was made, the weapon was no longer referred to as a rifled-musket and was instead referred to as simply a "rifle".

Characteristics of rifled muskets
In general, rifle muskets were the same length as the smoothbore muskets they replaced. Period U.S. Armory nomenclature described rifles and rifle-muskets as newly made firearms specifically designed and manufactured with rifling. Rifled muskets were smoothbore firearms returned to the armory or contractors for rifling. Considerable numbers of armory-stored smoothbores were converted in this way in the 1850s upon adoption of the Minié ball as the standard projectile. Rifle muskets tended to be of smaller caliber than their smoothbore predecessors, for example, the .58 caliber U.S. Springfield Model 1855 or the .577 caliber British Pattern 1853 Enfield. Tests conducted by the U.S. Army in the mid-1850s showed that the smaller caliber was more accurate at longer ranges. The cylindro-conical shape of the Minié ball also meant that the smaller-diameter but longer .58 caliber Minié ball had roughly the same amount of lead and weight as the larger .69 round ball. While the caliber was reduced, the overall length of the barrel was not. Shorter rifles could have easily been made (and were made for specific branches or arms such as mounted infantry and riflemen) that would have been more accurate than the smoothbore muskets they replaced, but military commanders still used tactics like firing by ranks, and feared that with a shorter weapon the soldiers in the rear ranks might accidentally shoot the front rank soldiers in the back of the head. Military commanders at the time also believed that bayonet fighting would continue to be important in battles, which also influenced the decision to retain existing barrel lengths.

In the US and British service standardized infantry firearms were produced in a longer "rifle musket" version and a shorter "rifle" version, such as the Springfield Model 1855. In the British forces the distinction was retained between the full-length musket issued to the infantry as a whole, and the shorter and handier version of the Enfield produced for specialist rifle regiments and marines. The long version had the barrel held to the stock by three metal bands, while the shorter version needed just two, so they are referred to as “3-band” and “2-band” Enfields respectively.

Rifle muskets typically used percussion lock systems, with some exceptions like the Springfield Model 1855, which also was equipped with the Maynard tape primer system.

Since rifle muskets were meant as a direct replacement for smoothbore muskets, they were fitted with bayonets.

In military use, rifle musket loading was simplified somewhat through the use of paper cartridges, which were significantly different from modern metallic cartridges. They typically consisted of rolled-up tubes of paper containing a premeasured amount of black powder and a greased Minié ball. The paper was torn open (typically with the shooter's teeth), the powder was poured down the barrel, the Minié ball was placed into the barrel and rammed down on top of the powder with the ramrod.  The paper was then discarded. Also differing from a modern cartridge, a separate percussion cap had to be placed onto the percussion lock's cone before the weapon could be fired. The Maynard tape primer system attempted to speed up this last step by using paper strips similar to those used in modern toy cap guns in place of the percussion cap, but this proved to be unreliable in field service and was abandoned on later weapons.

An exception to this method was the Enfield rifle-musket cartridge. There were no lubrication rings moulded or swaged into the Enfield projectile. The projectile was inserted upside down in the cartridge and the outside of the cartridge paper was greased at the projectile end and intended to be inserted and used as a paper patch. A ramrod was used to fully seat the round.

Use in battle
Rifled muskets were heavily used in the American Civil War. The American-made Springfield Model 1861 was the most widely used weapon in the war, followed by the British Pattern 1853 Enfield.  The Lorenz rifle was the third most used rifle during the Civil War

The Enfield was also used in the Crimean War where its greater range provided a significant advantage over the much shorter-ranged Russian smoothbore muskets in certain combat circumstances.

However, soldiers armed with rifled muskets were not always successful on the battlefield.  In the Italian War of 1859, 
Austrian troops armed with rifled muskets, but insufficiently trained and practiced in their effective use, were defeated by French forces using aggressive skirmishing tactics and rapid bayonet assaults at close range.

See also
Muzzle-loading rifle
Springfield rifle
Rifle
Rifling

References

External links
 The Enfield Pattern 1853 through to its culmination as the Snider MkIII
 Rifle Musket and Minié Ball
 The Enfield Pattern 1856 Rifle Musket